Simona Petrík (born 10 November 1982) is a Slovak politician who served as a member of the National Council of Slovakia from 2016–2020.

Petrik was born on 10 November 1982 in Liptovský Mikuláš, Czechoslovak Socialist Republic. She studied political science at Comenius University in Bratislava. Prior to her political career, Petrik worked in the field of language education, running an English language educational agency. Petrik was also involved in feminist causes in Slovakia, working with the organization Real Women and founding the Women's Platform of Slovakia.

Political career 
Petrik entered politics in 2015 as a member of #SIEŤ, where she provided support to the party around women's issues. Petrik was elected as a member of #Network in the 2016 Slovak parliamentary election, but after the Centre-right #Network entered a coalition with Smer-SD Petrik left the party and sat as an independent. In the National Council, she served in the Public Administration and Regional Development committee.

In April 2016, Petrik was prohibited to enter parliamentary chambers by Deputy Speaker Bélu Bugár, due to the fact that she had her six-month old daughter with her.

During her time in the National Council, Petrik worked heavily on women's issues. Petrik filed a complaint with the Constitutional Court of Slovakia about discrimination around a law regulating private crèches (nursery schools). Additionally, Petrik pointed out the unconstitutionality of extra fees charged by the hospital for childbirth, including choosing your own obstetrician, Epidurals, and the presence of the father in the delivery room. When news of the story came to light, the Ministry of Health pledged to remove those fees. She tabled a bill in parliament calling for ten days of paternity leave for expectant fathers. Petrik also fought for equal pay, support for survivors of domestic violence, construction of new kindergartens, and additional prenatal and postnatal support for mothers.

Together with her independent parliamentary colleagues Miroslav Beblavý, Jozef Mihál, Katarína Macháčková, Viera Dubačová and Oto Žarnay, Petrik founded the party SPOLU in April 2017. At the same time, the initiators and founders of the party published their call Vráťme Slovensko ľuďom.

In July 2017, TASR reported that Petrik was one of the "most curious" members of parliament, having asked 57 questions of the government.

At the party's founding convention in Poprad on April 14, 2018, Petrík was elected one of the party's presidents.

In February 2019, in the lead-up to the 2019 European Parliament election in Slovakia, Miroslav Beblavý of SPOLU and Ivan Štefunko of Progressive Slovakia announced that the parties would run together in the European elections. Petrík placed third on the SPOLU list with 22,499 votes, and was not elected.

In the 2020 Slovak parliamentary election, SPOLU ran in a coalition with Progressive Slovakia. Petrik was in the ninth position on the candidate list. She received 14,713 votes, placing 8th among coalition candidates. However, the coalition failed to reach the 7% threshold to receive seats in parliament.

References 

People from Liptovský Mikuláš
Slovak politicians
Living people
1982 births
Members of the National Council (Slovakia) 2016-2020
Slovak feminists
21st-century Slovak women politicians
Comenius University alumni
Female members of the National Council (Slovakia)